The ARIA Singles Chart ranks the best-performing singles in Australia. Its data, published by the Australian Recording Industry Association, is based collectively on the weekly physical and digital sales and streams of singles. In 2021, 13 songs reached number one; the first, "Mood" by 24kGoldn featuring Iann Dior, returned to the top on the first chart of the year after spending nine weeks atop the chart in 2020. Eight artists, Olivia Rodrigo, Glass Animals, Daniel Caesar, Giveon, the Kid Laroi, Russ Millions, Tion Wayne and Dua Lipa reached the top for the first time.

Olivia Rodrigo and the Kid Laroi each achieved two number ones on the chart in 2021, while Justin Bieber spent the most weeks at number one of the year, with "Peaches" and the Kid Laroi duet "Stay" spending a combined total of 16 weeks atop the chart.

Chart history

Number-one artists

See also
2021 in music
List of number-one albums of 2021 (Australia)

References

Australia singles
Number-one singles
2021